Trithyreus is a genus of hubbardiid short-tailed whipscorpions, first described by Karl Kraepelin in 1899.

Species 
, the World Schizomida Catalog accepts the following two species:

 Trithyreus grassii (Thorell, 1889) – Myanmar
 Trithyreus sijuensis (Gravely, 1924) – India

References 

Schizomida genera